This article concerns the period 689 BC – 680 BC.

Events
 689 BC—King Sennacherib of Assyria sacks Babylon.
 688 BC—Icarius of Hyperesia wins the stadion race at the 23rd Olympic Games.
 685 BC—Chalcedon became a Greek colony.
 684 BC—Spring and Autumn period: Duke Zhuang, ruler of the Chinese state of Lu, defeats Duke Huan of Qi in the Battle of Changshao.
 684 BC—Cleoptolemus of Laconia wins the stadion race at the 24th Olympic Games.
 680 BC—Esarhaddon succeeds Sennacherib as king of Assyria.
 680 BC—Thalpis of Laconia wins the stadion race at the 25th Olympic Games.

Deaths
 682 BC—Death of Zhou zhuang wang, King of the Zhou Dynasty of China.

References